Mumbai Matinee is a 2003 Indian romantic comedy film directed and written by Anant Balani and starring Rahul Bose as a 32-year-old virgin. The film premiered on 26 September 2003 and was also released in the UK. Director Anant Balani died before the film was released on 29 August 2003.

Plot
Debu (Rahul Bose) is a 32-year-old advertising agent, but has a serious problem in that he is still a virgin. He meets Baba Hindustani (Vijay Raaz) in a hotel who promises to cure him of the teasing he gets from being a virgin. He later meets Nitin Kapoor, a film-maker (Saurabh Shukla) who later films him as he works out in the gym and other physical activities. Unaware of what is happening, Kapoor edits the film in such a way to give the impression of Debu as having sex. The film is released and becomes a box office hit and Debu quickly becomes a sex symbol. He later meets Sonali Verma (Perizaad Zorabian), a journalist, who helps him through his difficulties and they later fall in love.

Cast
 Rahul Bose as Debashish Chatterjee (Debu)
 Perizaad Zorabian as Sonali Verma
 Vijay Raaz as  Baba Hindustani
 Saurabh Shukla as Nitin Kapoor
 Anusha Dandekar as Anusha, the temptress
 Kabir Sadanand as Rakesh Sharma
 Asrani as  Pyarelal
 Bakul Thakkar as  Roshan Kumar
 Amar Talwar as Mahesh Ghodbole
 Sunila Karambelkar (actress) as Monica D'Costa
 Sanjay Gandhias  Rohan Khanna
 Noshirwan Jehangir as Pinto
 Shehzad Khan as Don
 Prithvi Zutshi as Police Inspector
 Pinky Chinoy as Prostitute

Soundtrack

 Anand Raj Anand - composer of the song "Loot Gaye"
 KK
 Shantanu Mukherjee
 Sonu Nigam
 Saswati Phukan
 Farhad Wadia

Track list
"Tera Dekh Ke Najara Tobba Tobba Mere Yara (Loot Gaye)" - Shashwati
"Tere Bina Mai Jiu Aise" - Kunal Ganjawala
"Ye Hai Mumbai" - Sonu Nigam
"You" - Shaan
"Bumbai Se Aaya Mera Dost" - Abbey
"Sex Is Good" - K. K.
"Shame" - Joe Alvares
"Tere Bina Mai Jiu Aise (2)" - Kunal Ganjawala

Critical reception

Taran Adarsh of Bollywood Hungama gave the film a rating of 1 out of 5 and said that, "The film has an interesting plot in fact a story like this has never been attempted by an Indian film-maker before but how one wishes the twists and turns in the story were captivating enough to keep you glued right till the climax." Shahshi Matta of Planet Bollywood gave the film a rating of 4.5 out of 10 saying that, "The film looks hurriedly put-together and the contemplation's of the protagonist at various points in this film (on love, the gay character, etc.) look like they belong to another film. A film that could have been. But clearly wasn’t." R. Swaminathan of Rediff commented on the film saying that, "The film is not everyone's cup of tea. If you are looking for a family entertainer, you are eyeing the wrong film. But if you want time out with your locker room buddies or with your girlfriend, Mumbai Matinee is the film." India Today criticized the film saying that, "Matinee's meandering script hobbles on its compelling plot, and by the time the nerd scrambles into bed, you are past caring."

References

External links
 
 
 

2003 films
2000s Hindi-language films
2003 romantic comedy films
Films about virginity
Films scored by Anand Raj Anand
Films about Bollywood
HIV/AIDS in Indian films
Films directed by Anant Balani
2000s English-language films